Bank shot may refer to:

Sports 
 Bank shot (basketball), type of shot
 Bank shot, a 
 Bank shot, move in air hockey

Other uses
 Bank Shot, a 1974 film
 Bank Shot, a novel in the John Dortmunder series published by Donald E. Westlake
 "Bankshot", a song by Operation Ivy from the 1989 album Energy